West Thebarton, previously known as West Thebarton Brothel Party, is an Australian rock band from Adelaide.

History
West Thebarton cut their teeth practising in a studio in West Thebarton Road, in the western Adelaide suburb of Thebarton, hence the name of the band.

They released their debut album Different Beings Being Different in 2018.

Members
Current members
Ray Dalfsen – lead vocals, guitar (2013–present)
Josh Healey – guitar, backing vocals (2013–present)
Tom Gordon – guitar, backing vocals (2013–present)
Josh Battersby – guitar (2013–present)
Brian Bolado – guitar, percussion, backing vocals (2013–present)
Nick Horvat – bass (2015–present)
Caitlin Thomas – drums (2017–present)

Former members
Hugh Black – drums (2015–2017)
Will Spooner-Adey – bass (2013–2015)
Alex Christophel – drums (2013–2015)

Discography

Studio albums

Live albums

Extended plays

Singles

Awards and nominations

AIR Awards
The Australian Independent Record Awards (commonly known informally as AIR Awards) is an annual awards night to recognise, promote and celebrate the success of Australia's Independent Music sector.

|-
| AIR Awards of 2019
| Different Beings Being Different
| Best Independent Hard Rock, Heavey or Punk Album
| 
|-

ARIA Music Awards
The ARIA Music Awards are a set of annual ceremonies presented by Australian Recording Industry Association (ARIA), which recognise excellence, innovation, and achievement across all genres of the music of Australia. They commenced in 1987.

|-
| 2018
| Different Beings Being Different
| Best Hard Rock/Heavy Metal Album
| 
|-

National Live Music Awards
The National Live Music Awards (NLMAs) are a broad recognition of Australia's diverse live industry, celebrating the success of the Australian live scene. The awards commenced in 2016.

|-
| rowspan="3" | National Live Music Awards of 2018
| rowspan="3" | West Thebarton
| Live Act of the Year
| 
|-
| International Live Achievement (Band)
| 
|-
| South Australian Live Act of the Year
| 
|-
| National Live Music Awards of 2020
| themselves 
| South Australian Live Act of the Year
| 
|-

South Australian Music Awards
The South Australian Music Awards (SAM Awards) exist to recognise, promote and celebrate excellence in the South Australian contemporary music industry and take place annually in Adelaide, South Australia every November.

|-
| rowspan="4"| SAM Awards of 2018
| themselves
| Best Group
| 
|-
| Different Beings Being Different
| Best Release
| 
|-
| "Bible Camp"
| Best Song
| 
|-
| themselves
| People's Choice Rock Award
| 
|-

References

External link

Musical groups from Adelaide